Kalne is a village (selo) located in Ternopil Raion (district), Ternopil Oblast (province of Western Ukraine). It belongs to Zboriv urban hromada, one of the hromadas of Ukraine. 

The area of the village is 6,295 km2 and it has a population of 537 people.  Local government is administered by Kalnenska village council, which consists of two villages: Kalne and Zhabynia.

Geography 

History and Attractions 
The first written mention of the village dates back to year 1492. In 1811 in the village been constructed a wooden church. It is a Church of the Resurrection (1811).  

Until 18 July 2020, Kalne belonged to Zboriv Raion. The raion was abolished in July 2020 as part of the administrative reform of Ukraine, which reduced the number of raions of Ternopil Oblast to three. The area of Zboriv Raion was merged into Ternopil Raion.

The priest Luka Demchuk (1873 -1929)   has been headed the parish of the village Kal'ne from 1909 to 1929. He has been grandfather of the UGCC of Cardinal Lubomyr Husar.

References

External links 
 weather.in.ua/Kal'ne (Zborivs'kyi district)
 weather.in.ua/Zhabynia (Ternopil region)

Literature 
  — S. 703. 

Villages in Ternopil Raion